Norimasa (written: 憲政 or 教正) is a masculine Japanese given name. Notable people with the name include:

 (1893–1964), Japanese film director and theorist
 (1523–1579), Japanese daimyō

Japanese masculine given names